Walter Huntley Long (March 5, 1879 – July 4, 1952) was an American character actor in films from the 1910s.

Career
Born in Nashua, New Hampshire, Long appeared in nearly 200 films.

Long debuted in films in 1909 with Broncho Billy Anderson. He disliked the working conditions for making films, so after that project he returned to acting on stage.

He appeared in many D. W. Griffith films, notably The Birth of a Nation (1915), where he appeared as Gus, an African American, in blackface make-up, and Intolerance (1916). He also supported Rudolph Valentino in the films The Sheik, Moran of the Lady Letty, and Blood and Sand. He later appeared as a comic villain in four Laurel and Hardy films during the early 1930s.

On Broadway, Long appeared in Adonis (1899), Leave It to Me! (1938), Very Warm for May (1939), Boys and Girls Together (1940), Follow the Girls (1944), and Toplitzky of Notre Dame (1946).

Personal life
In 1908, Long married Luray Grace Roblee, a stenographer from Wisconsin who later became an actress at Triangle/Fine Arts. She died in 1919 at age 29, due to the Spanish influenza epidemic. On October 16, 1923, he married Leta Amanda Held in Los Angeles, California. They adopted a son whom they called John Huntley Long.  

Long served during World War I and World War II, attaining the rank of lieutenant colonel before receiving an honorable discharge at the end of World War II.

Although he was often called upon to play antagonists and villains because of his gravel voice and rugged appearance, many people reported that he was actually a warm, kindhearted man off-camera.

Death
Long died of a heart attack on July 4, 1952, in Los Angeles, California, while watching the fireworks display at The Coliseum, during Fourth of July celebrations.

Long is buried in Hollywood Forever Cemetery in Hollywood, California.

Filmography

References

External links

 
 
 

1879 births
1952 deaths
People from Nashua, New Hampshire
American male silent film actors
United States Army personnel of World War I
United States Army personnel of World War II
Hal Roach Studios actors
Male actors from New Hampshire
20th-century American male actors
United States Army colonels
American male stage actors
Broadway theatre people